Caragh M. O’Brien is the author of the Birthmarked trilogy, a series of young adult, dystopian novels. Her books take place in a world destroyed by climate change.

Early life
O'Brien was born in St. Paul, Minnesota. She graduated from Williams College with a Bachelor of Science in physics, and earned her MA in the Writing Seminars at Johns Hopkins University.

Career
Before becoming a full-time writer, O’Brien was a high school teacher. She also published romance novels.

Personal life
O'Brien is married with three children; two sons and one daughter. She is one of seven children in her family and she has sixteen nieces and six nephews.

Bibliography

Birthmarked Trilogy 

Birthmarked, Roaring Brook Press, 2010
Prized, Roaring Brook Press, 2011
Promised, Roaring Brook Press, 2012

Short stories in the Birthmarked universe:
"Tortured", set between Birthmarked and Prized; published online at Tor.com, and in 
"Ruled", set between Prized and Promised; published online at Tor.com
Additional tie-in stories are available from Caragh O'Brien's personal web site

Vault of Dreamers Trilogy 
 The Vault of Dreamers, Roaring Brook Press, 2016
 The Rule of Mirrors, Roaring Brook Press, 2016
 The Keep of Ages, Roaring Brook Press, 2017

References

External links

http://us.macmillan.com/author/caraghmobrien

Living people
21st-century American novelists
American writers of young adult literature
Year of birth missing (living people)
American women novelists
21st-century American women writers